Somali Sign Language (SSL) is a sign language used by the deaf community in Somaliland and Djibouti.

In the 1980s a school for the deaf was established in the Somali Kenyan town of Wajir by Annalena Tonelli.  Students there became fluent in Kenyan Sign Language.  In 1997, three graduates from Wajir helped establish the first school for the deaf in Somaliland called the Annalena School for the Deaf named after the late Annalena Tonelli, in Borama.  One of the teachers at Boroma soon founded a school in Djibouti, and, with a bit more difficulty, another was established in Hargeisa.

See also
Languages of Somaliland

References

Languages of Somaliland
Languages of Djibouti